Weightlifting was contested from September 30 to October 10 at the 2002 Asian Games in Pukyong National University Gymnasium, Busan, South Korea.

Schedule

Medalists

Men

Women

Medal table

Participating nations
A total of 143 athletes from 30 nations competed in weightlifting at the 2002 Asian Games:

References

 Men's results
 Women's results

External links
 Weightlifting Database

 
2002
2002 Asian Games events
Asian Games
2002
International weightlifting competitions hosted by South Korea